Hindustan Janata Party (India People's Party) is a minor political party in India. It is one of many splinter groups of Janata Dal.

References 

Political parties in India
Political schisms
Janata Dal